Michelle Gerards (born 8 July 1984) is a former professional tennis player from the Netherlands.

Biography
A right-handed player from Limburg, Gerards was the Dutch Under-18 champion at the age of 13 and was a junior quarterfinalist at the 1999 French Open.

Most of her professional career was spent on the ITF Circuit, reaching a best ranking in singles of 207 in the world. She made WTA Tour main-draw appearances at the 1999 Sanex Trophy in Knokke-Heist and 2000 Belgian Open, both times as a wildcard.

Gerards featured in four Fed Cup ties for the Netherlands. In 2005, she played two doubles matches, partnering Dutch veteran Brenda Schultz-McCarthy, winning both, over Poland and Luxembourg. When she returned to the Fed Cup team in 2009, it was as a singles player and she won one match, over Claudine Schaul of Luxembourg.

ITF Circuit finals

Singles: 21 (11 titles, 10 runner-ups)

Doubles: 18 (9 titles, 9 runner-ups)

References

External links
 
 
 

1984 births
Living people
Dutch female tennis players
Sportspeople from Limburg (Netherlands)